Lieuwe de Boer (born 26 June 1951) is a former ice speed skater from the Netherlands, who represented his native country at the 1980 Winter Olympics in Lake Placid, United States. There he won the bronze medal in the men's 500 metres.

References
 SkateResults
 Genealogical site

1951 births
Living people
Dutch male speed skaters
Speed skaters at the 1980 Winter Olympics
Olympic speed skaters of the Netherlands
Olympic bronze medalists for the Netherlands
People from Opsterland
Place of birth missing (living people)
Olympic medalists in speed skating
Medalists at the 1980 Winter Olympics
Sportspeople from Friesland